The North Carolina Democratic Party (NCDP) is the North Carolina affiliate of the Democratic Party. It is headquartered in the historic Goodwin House, located in Raleigh.

The party controls the governorship and three other statewide elected offices, as well as seven of the state's 14 U.S. House seats. Since the 2010 passage of the Affordable Care Act, North Carolina Democrats have advocated for Medicaid expansion (a policy that would provide a federally subsidized health insurance plan to approximately 500,000 North Carolinians) as well as for increasing the state's minimum wage.

History

The Second Party System emerged from a divide in the Democratic-Republican Party in 1828. They split off into two groups, the Democrats, led by Andrew Jackson, and the Whigs. In North Carolina, people from the west and northeast supported the Whigs mainly for their policies on education and internal improvements. Meanwhile, eastern North Carolina was dominated by wealthy planters who tended to oppose activist government. During the Civil War, Whigs and Unionist Democrats formed the Conservative Party and elected Zebulon Vance as governor on a platform of supporting the Confederate war effort while defending states' rights and civil liberties against the Confederate government in Richmond. Postwar, the Conservative Party reorganized to oppose the reconstruction policies enacted by the U.S. Congress following the Civil War. By 1870, the two main parties were the Conservatives (who changed their name to "Democratic-Conservatives" and then to Democrats by 1876) and the Republicans.

Before the 1960s, many NCDP leaders, as was the case with most state parties in the South, supported racial segregation. But beginning with the Republicans' 1964 presidential campaign and Richard Nixon's "Southern strategy" in 1968, white segregationists, including former U.S. Senator Jesse Helms, flocked to the Republican Party. Since then, most minority voters have supported the NCDP. Jimmy Carter carried North Carolina in the 1976 election, but from 1980 to 2004, the Republican presidential nominee won the state.

In spite of the conservative bent of North Carolina politics, a number of Democrats, such as Terry Sanford and John Edwards, have been elected to represent the state at the federal level. Edwards was the Democratic nominee for vice president in 2004. Republican U.S. Senator Elizabeth Dole was defeated for reelection in 2008 by Democrat Kay Hagan, the same year Barack Obama carried the state in his victory over Republican John McCain by a margin of less than one half of a percentage point.

Since the passage of the Affordable Care Act, North Carolina Democrats have prioritized advocating Medicaid expansion in the state, a policy that would provide a federally subsidized healthcare plan to approximately 500,000 North Carolinians. Another priority for North Carolina Democrats in the 2010s and 2020s has been increasing the minimum wage.

Recent electoral results

2006
North Carolina Democrats scored impressive victories in the 2006 general elections, increasing their majorities in both houses of the North Carolina General Assembly and defeating incumbent Republican U.S. Representative Charles H. Taylor. In addition, most candidates backed by Democrats in the non-partisan races for the North Carolina Supreme Court and the North Carolina Court of Appeals were elected. These victories came despite controversies surrounding Jim Black, a Democrat and former Speaker of the North Carolina House of Representatives.

2008
In 2008, the North Carolina Democratic Party once again earned major victories in state and federal elections. For the first time since 1976, the Democratic nominee carried North Carolina in the presidential election. Meanwhile, Kay Hagan was elected to the U.S. Senate over incumbent Elizabeth Dole, and Beverly Perdue was elected governor to succeed fellow Democrat Mike Easley.

2010
In 2010, Republicans swept North Carolina, taking control of both houses of the General Assembly for the first time since 1896, reelecting Richard Burr to a second term by double digits, and unseating incumbent Democratic U.S. Representative Bob Etheridge.

2012
Bev Perdue retired as governor and the Democratic nominee for governor, Lieutenant Governor of North Carolina Walter H. Dalton was defeated in the general election by Republican Pat McCrory. Incumbent Democratic U.S. Representative Larry Kissell was unseated, and two open U.S. House seats previously controlled by Democrats were also gained by Republicans.

2014
2014 saw incumbent Senator Kay Hagan defeated for reelection, and the seat of U.S. Representative Mike McIntyre who had retired was taken by a Republican. Democrats in the North Carolina House of Representatives flipped four seats from Republican held districts in Wake and Buncombe counties. The state party also saw success in the non-partisan races for North Carolina Supreme Court and the North Carolina Court of Appeals.

2016
In 2016, Democrats retook the governor's office, electing then-Attorney General Roy Cooper, while also electing a Democrat to succeed him as Attorney General, Josh Stein. Meanwhile, Democrats lost seats in the North Carolina Council of State, picked up one seat in the state House and lost one seat in the state Senate. Democratic nominee Deborah K. Ross lost the U.S. Senate election to incumbent Richard Burr. Democrats retook the majority on the North Carolina Supreme Court for the first time in the 21st century.

2018
In 2018, Democrats added a seat to their judicial majority on the North Carolina Supreme Court when Anita Earls defeated Incumbent Republican Justice Barbara Jackson and lawyer Chris Anglin winning by a plurality vote of 48.79%. Democrats also gained two seats on the North Carolina Court of Appeals and incumbent judge John S. Arrowood ran for his first full term after being appointed by Governor Roy Cooper in 2017. Legislative Democrats were able to break the Republican supermajority's in both the State House and Senate for the first time since losing control of both chambers in 2010.

NCDP organizations
North Carolina Democratic Women
Young Democrats of North Carolina
College Democrats of North Carolina
NC Senior Democrats
NC Teen Democrats
African American Caucus of the NC  
NCDP Hispanic American Caucus 
LGBT Democrats of North Carolina
NCDP Disability Issues Caucus

Leadership
The state party chair is Anderson Clayton, who was elected in 2023. The chair is elected by and leads the state Executive Committee, a body of more than 700 Democratic Party leaders and activists from all 100 counties, which governs the party. Jonah Garson is the First Vice-Chair, Kimberly Hardy is the second Vice-Chair, Elijah King is the Third Vice-Chair and Melvin Williams is the Secretary.

Current elected officials

Members of Congress

U.S. Senate
None

Both of North Carolina's U.S. Senate seats have been held by Republicans since 2014. Kay Hagan was the last Democrat to represent North Carolina in the U.S. Senate. First elected in 2008, Hagan lost her bid for a second term in 2014 to Republican challenger Thom Tillis who has held the seat since.

U.S. House of Representatives
Out of the 14 seats North Carolina is apportioned in the U.S. House of Representatives, seven are held by Democrats:

Statewide offices
Democrats control four of the ten elected statewide offices:

 State Auditor: Beth Wood

State legislative leaders
 Senate Minority Leader: Dan Blue
Senate Minority Whip: Jay Chaudhuri
Senate Minority Caucus Secretary: Ben Clark (politician)
 House Minority Leader: Robert T. Reives II
House Deputy Minority Leader: TBD
House Minority Whips: Cynthia Ball, Garland E. Pierce, Deb Butler, Carla Cunningham, and Amos Quick.

State House

There are 51 Democratic State House members as of 2021. Current members are listed below:

District 5: Howard J. Hunter III
District 8: Kandie Smith
District 9: Brian Farkas 
District 11: Allison Dahle
District 18: Deb Butler
District 21: Raymond Smith Jr.
District 23: Shelly Willingham
District 24: Linda Cooper-Suggs
District 25: James Gailliard
District 27: Michael H. Wray
District 29: Vernetta Alston
District 30: Marcia Morey
District 31: Zack Forde-Hawkins
District 32: Terry Garrison
District 33: Rosa Gill
District 34: Grier Martin
District 35: Terence Everitt
District 36: Julie von Haefen
District 38: Abe Jones
District 39: James Roberson
District 40: Joe John
District 41: Gale Adcock
District 42: Marvin W. Lucas
District 44: William O. Richardson
District 47: Charles Graham
District 48: Garland E. Pierce
District 49: Cynthia Ball
District 50: Graig R. Meyer
District 54: Robert T. Reives II
District 56: Verla Insko
District 57: Ashton Clemmons
District 58: Amos Quick
District 60: Cecil Brockman
District 61: Pricey Harrison
District 63: Ricky Hurtado
District 71: Evelyn Terry
District 72: Amber Baker
District 88: Mary Belk
District 92: Terry M. Brown Jr.
District 99: Nasif Majeed
District 100: John Autry
District 101: Carolyn Logan
District 102: Becky Carney
District 103: Rachel Hunt
District 104: Brandon Lofton
District 105: Wesley Harris
District 106: Carla D. Cunningham
District 107: Kelly Alexander
District 114: Susan C. Fisher
District 115: John Ager
District 116: Brian Turner

State Senate

There are 22 Democratic State Senators. Current senators are listed below:

District 3: Ernestine Bazemore
District 4: Toby Fitch
District 5: Donald G. Davis
District 14: Dan Blue
District 15: Jay Chaudhuri
District 16: Wiley Nickel
District 17: Sydney Batch
District 18: Sarah Crawford
District 19: Kirk deViere
District 20: Natalie Murdock
District 21: Ben Clark
District 22: Mike Woodard
District 23: Valerie Foushee
District 27: Michael Garrett 
District 28: Gladys Robinson
District 32: Paul A. Lowe Jr.
District 37: Jeff Jackson
District 38: Mujtaba A. Mohammed
District 39: DeAndrea Salvador
District 40: Joyce Waddell
District 41: Natasha Marcus
District 49: Julie Mayfield

See also
Buncombe Democratic Party
North Carolina Republican Party
Elections in North Carolina
Electoral reform in North Carolina
North Carolina State Board of Elections
Politics of North Carolina
Political party strength in North Carolina
Wilmington insurrection of 1898

Notes

External links
 North Carolina Democratic Party
 Young Democrats of North Carolina
 NC Senior Dems
 High School Democrats of NC

 
Democratic Party (United States) by state
Democratic Party